Mark Leggett is an American guitarist/composer who has composed music for hundreds of television and documentary productions in the U.S.

Credits include television series My Name Is Earl, theme music for The Pretender (Emmy nominated), the Dolly Parton television movie “Coat of Many Colors”, and the independent feature film American Romance.

Documentary credits include "Anne Frank's Holocaust", "Conquistador : A Day In Their Lives" (Emmy nominated ), "Nazi America: A Secret History", and "Wage Slaves: Not Getting By in America" as well as many other broad-ranging documentary series and programs.

Past work includes scoring the Werner Herzog narrated film "Dinotasia", composing theme music recorded by Levon Helm and The Band, and scoring documentaries with guitarist/songwriter Richard Thompson.

References

External links

   Mark Leggett Website

American male composers
American guitarists
21st-century American composers
Living people
21st-century American male musicians
Year of birth missing (living people)